The British Cemetery of Funchal on the Portuguese island of Madeira contains three Commonwealth burials of the First World War and three from the Second World War, all seamen of the Royal or Merchant navies.

History
The British Cemetery dates its origin from 1770. Prior to this date, Madeiran law dictated that the mortal remains of those deceased who were not Roman Catholic by faith were to be buried at sea, thrown from the cliffs at Garajau; later, a statue of Christ, called Cristo Rei, was erected in remembrance of this.

However, from 1772 onward, British interests in Madeira secured a burial ground, called the Nation´s Burial Ground, close to the original city walls of Funchal. The site of this earlier cemetery is taken up by a small public square and car showrooms today. All remains and headstones etc were moved in 1890 to an extensive adjoining plot, which incorporates a British military cemetery (dating from 1808) and chapel (1865 onwards).

Although named the British Cemetery and administered by the Anglican church of the Holy Trinity (an example of early 19th-century Neo-Classical architecture) nearby, the cemetery holds graves of many nationalities, including a large number of German Protestants. 

There is free public access to the cemetery and limited public access to its archives. A weekly historical tour of the cemetery and church is available through Holy Trinity Church.

Notable interments

Paul Langerhans, discovered the Islets of Langerhans in the pancreas
Captain Cecil Buckley, the first to be gazetted with the Victoria Cross, in 1875
George Oruigbiji Pepple, ruled the Kingdom of Bonny, now part of Nigeria
William Reid, founder of the Reid's Palace Hotel in Funchal
Sara Forbes Bonetta, Nigerian princess and god-daughter of Queen Victoria

References

Cemeteries in Madeira
Anglican cemeteries in Europe
Anglican cemeteries in Africa
British diaspora in Africa